The Château de Montgeoffroy is an 18th-century manor house located in the commune of Mazé (Maine-et-Loire), France.

In 1676, Érasme de Contades acquired the property. In 1772, the Marshal Louis Georges Érasme de Contades, governor of Alsace, decided to rebuild the château as a retirement home. He called on the Parisian architect Jean-Benoît-Vincent Barré, who worked with the local architect Simier.

The marshal being far from Anjou, the work was directed primarily by his son, le marquis de Contades, his daughter-in-law, Julie Constantin de Marans, his mistress, Hélène Hérault, and her daughter-in-law, Marie-Marguerite Magon de La Lande. It took three years.

The old château was burned down, but Barré appreciated its U shape and kept two towers and the moat, as well as the chapel, which dated from 1543. 

The building miraculously survived the French Revolution and the Revolt in the Vendée conserving its common buildings, agricultural structures, chapel and park. It also kept its archives and its furniture, which was studied by Pierre Verlet.

External links

 History and description 

Montgeoffroy
Historic house museums in Pays de la Loire
Museums in Maine-et-Loire